Ledda Bay is a shallow embayment or bight,  long, in the north side of Grant Island, off the coast of Marie Byrd Land, Antarctica.

References

Bays of Marie Byrd Land
Bights (geography)